Aditya Datt is an Indian filmmaker known for directing Bollywood films such as Aashiq Banaya Aapne and Table No.21. He is the grandson of film lyricist Anand Bakshi.

Filmography

Films

Web series 
 Karenjit Kaur – The Untold Story of Sunny Leone (2018)

Personal life
Datt is the grandson of lyricist Anand Bakshi.

References

External links
  
 Aditya Datt at Bollywood Hungama

Indian film directors
Film directors from Mumbai
Living people
Hindi-language film directors
Year of birth missing (living people)